This is the progression of world record improvements of the 100 metres hurdles M55 division of Masters athletics.

Key

References

Masters athletics world record progressions